Theodore Oesten (also Theodor in German) (not Theodore in German) (December 31, 1813 – March 16, 1870) was a German composer, musician, and music teacher.

Oesten was born in Berlin.  He learned to play wind and string instruments from the Stadtmusikus in Fürstenwalde (a small town outside Berlin). At the age of nineteen he studied composition with Böhmer, Carl Friedrich Rungenhagen, G. A. Schneider and August Wilhelm Bach in Berlin. Oesten is perhaps best known for his easy to play piano compositions, including transcriptions of operatic works, written in the sentimental style of his day. He died in his native city of Berlin. His son Max Oesten also became a composer.

Partial list of piano compositions
(Note: Items without reference numbers are from a list at Piano Master*Works.

A Little Story
12 Standard Pieces For Piano: Alpine Bells (Alpenglockchen)
Alpine Glow (Alpengluhen Idylle), Op. 193
Carnival Of Venice (Capricietto Brillant)
Cradle Song (Schlummerlied), Opus 91
De Boself
Der kuss, Opus 205
Dolly's Dreaming and Awakening (Puppchens Traumen Und Erwachen!); Cradle Song (Wiegenlied), Opus 202, No. 4
Echo Idylle, Opus 223
Farewell
Forest Roses
Gondellied, Op. 56
Heavenly Bliss (Seliges Gluck), Opus 50, No. 4
Illustrations: Six Elegant Fantasias n Favorite Themes, Op. 99
La fille du régiment, Opus 57, No. 10, Perles de L'Opera, 12 Morceaux Elegantes
Long Long Weary Day, Op. 49
Love In May (Maienliebe), Op. 50, No. 1
Lucia Di Lammermoor, Six Fantaisies Brilliantes Sur Des Motifs Favoris De L'Opera, Op. 67
Morning Song
On The Rialto (Auf Den Lugunen), Barcarolle For Piano, Op. 222
Serenade, Op. 50, No. 2
Sleep Well, Thou Sweet Angel, Opus 277 No. 2
Snowbells' Spring Carol (Idylle), Op. 227
Souvenir de Martha, Fantaisie Brillante On Flotow's Opera
Spanish Dance Op.61, No.10
The Little Tyrolean Maid
When The Swallows Homeward Fly: Agathe
With Bow And Arrow

Notes

External links
Theodore Oesten
University of North Carolina at Chapel Hill: Music Library--19th Century American Sheet Music Digitization Project
Historic American Sheet Music (Digital Scriptorium collection, Duke University)
Music for the Nation: American Sheet Music, 1870-1885 (American Memory collection, Library of Congress)

1813 births
1870 deaths
German Romantic composers
German classical pianists
Male classical pianists
German music educators
19th-century classical composers
German male classical composers
19th-century classical pianists
19th-century German composers
German pianists
German male pianists
19th-century German male musicians